Caloptilia paradoxum is a moth of the family Gracillariidae. It is known from the United States (including Florida, Maine, Massachusetts, Michigan, Pennsylvania, South Carolina and Texas).

References

paradoxum
Moths of North America
Moths described in 1873